The Goodyear Type AD was a small airship built in the United States in the mid-1920s. The first example, christened Pilgrim, was Goodyear's first civil airship, and their first airship to use helium as its lift gas. Originally intended for pleasure cruising, it soon found its true calling as a promotional vehicle as the first "Goodyear Blimp" in a line that has continued for over ninety years. The Type AD was a conventional blimp design with a gondola that could carry two passengers in addition to the flight crew. While usually described as a non-rigid type, the design in fact incorporated a triangular-section magnesium girder as a keel, fastened inside the envelope. The craft carried its own collapsible mooring mast which allowed it to "land" anywhere that 250 ft × 250 ft (76 m × 76 m) of clear ground was available.

A contemporary article in Flight describes the original intentions behind the design as:

Pilgrim was retired on 30 December 1931, having completed 4,765 flights and having carried 5,355 passengers. In that time, she remained aloft for 2,880 hours and covered 95,000 miles (15,300 km). Her gondola is preserved in the National Air and Space Museum.

Specifications

References
Notes

Bibliography
 
 
 Goodyear "Pilgrim" Gondola – National Air and Space Museum

1920s United States sport aircraft
Goodyear aircraft
Airships of the United States
Aircraft first flown in 1925